Thunder and Fire is an album by the American band Jason & the Scorchers, released in 1989. The band promoted the album by playing shows with, among others, Webb Wilder and Bob Dylan. "When the Angels Cry" and "Find You" were released as singles.

The album was a commercial disappointment, failing to chart. The band broke up after the album's release, but reformed in the mid-1990s.

Production
The album was produced by Barry Beckett. The band placed stage lights in the studio, to reproduce the atmosphere of a live show. The Scorchers spent two years making the album, recording it with new members Andy York and Ken Fox; the band had around 45 songs from which to choose.

"My Kingdom for a Car" is a cover of the Phil Ochs song. "Bible and a Gun" was cowritten by Steve Earle. Don Schlitz cowrote "When the Angels Cry".

Critical reception

Trouser Press wrote that "rather than successfully integrating the group's stylistic impulses, Thunder and Fire divides them into reheated rockers that short the Scorchers' personality and semi-acoustic country numbers that seem out of place." The Washington Post concluded that "comes closer to the band's high-voltage live show than any of its first three albums." The Richmond Times-Dispatch labeled that band "honest, unfussy and committed to delivering red hot rock 'n' roll." The Houston Chronicle considered it "a graceful attempt at gaining a wider audience without sacrificing the band's soul."

The Chicago Tribune determined that "Jason is no snarler–his voice is plaintive–and his melodies keep ringing long after the volume subsides." The New York Times concluded that "few bands can deliver clanging, stomping, crunching flat-out rock-and-roll like Jason and the Scorchers." The Chicago Sun-Times opined that Thunder and Fire "lacks the songwriting richness of previous efforts, but it comes close to capturing the concert sizzle of America's most incendiary roots-rock band."

AllMusic wrote that "Bible and a Gun" "recalls the best things about the roots-rock movement of the late '80s." The Providence Journal listed the album as one of the ten best of 1989. The Austin American-Statesman deemed "When the Angels Cry" "the most powerful music of the band's recorded history." The Rolling Stone Album Guide noted that the songs were still about "girls and driving."

Track listing

References

Jason & the Scorchers albums
1989 albums
A&M Records albums